Halosarcinochlamys is a genus of green algae in the family Chlamydomonadaceae according to the National Center for Biotechnology Information (NCBI). No such genus is listed by AlgaeBase.

References

External links

Chlamydomonadales
Chlamydomonadales genera